WZML-LP (92.9 FM) is a community radio station licensed to Bryn Mawr, Pennsylvania and serves the Chester and Delaware County area.  Its broadcast license is held by the Inge Davidson Foundation.  It broadcasts a Classic Alternative format.

History 
This station received its original construction permit from the Federal Communications Commission on December 1, 2014.  The new station was assigned the WZML-LP call sign by the FCC on December 10, 2014.  The station received its license to cover from the FCC on August 29, 2016.  The station also streams at tunein.com and on iTunes. 

On November 23rd, 2021, WZML flipped to a classic alternative format with a new station manager taking over. 

WZML's lineup features The Vinyl Frontier on Monday nights at 9pm, which is a jazz, psychedelic and neo-soul music show, From Prussia with Love on Wednesday nights at 9pm, which is a freeform talk and music show, The Record Hop with Korey Oats on Thursday nights at 7pm, and The Story Untold with Phil Noce on Sunday nights at 7pm. Monday at 3am, the Phish Phiesta with Nicholas Silvanio broadcasts until 6am.

References

External links 
 

ZML
Radio stations established in 2016
2016 establishments in Pennsylvania
ZML-LP